Voice is the sixth solo studio album by English singer Alison Moyet, released by Sanctuary Records on 6 September 2004 in the United Kingdom and on 12 October 2004 in the United States. It is a covers album, featuring slow-tempo, classic songs from a number of different genres, designed to showcase the singer's voice, with orchestral backing.

A deluxe edition of Voice was released by Cooking Vinyl on 2 October 2015.

Background
After a performance with the BBC Concert Orchestra in 2003, Moyet approached conductor Anne Dudley with the idea of recording a "collection of classic song". In light of her appreciation of Moyet's distinctive vocal style, Dudley later described the offer of working with her as "irresistible". For her official website, she commented: "We spent many happy hours playing songs on the piano, minutely adjusting keys to suit her voice. We chose a wonderful selection and recorded them organically." The material was recorded at Angel Studios, London, with Dudley as producer and arranger.

Voice was released in September 2004 and reached  7 in the UK, spending 12 weeks on the chart. Preceding the album was the single "Windmills of Your Mind", which failed to make a chart appearance. The second and final single, released in December 2004, was a double release of "Almost Blue" and "Alfie". It reached No. 99 in the UK.

Speaking to the BBC News in 2004, Moyet commented: "As a 43-year-old I'm finding that reflective, beautiful songs appeal to me. I am quite a prolific singer, in the sense that I have a versatility and I don't want to be limited purely to the songs that I can write."

Track listing

Personnel

Musicians

 Alison Moyet – lead vocals
 Anthony Pleeth – cello (tracks: 1 to 9, 11)
 Dave Daniels – cello (tracks: 6, 7, 9)
 Martin Loveday – cello (tracks: 6, 7, 9)
 Paul Kegg – cello (tracks: 1, 2, 4, 6 to 9)
 Nicholas Bucknall – clarinet (tracks: 1, 4, 11)
 Chris Laurence – double bass (tracks: 1, 2, 4 to 9)
 Ralph Salmins – drums (tracks: 2, 3, 5 to 7, 10)
 John Parricelli – guitar (tracks: 2, 4 to 7, 10)
 Anne Dudley – piano (tracks: 1 to 7, 9 to 10), electric piano (tracks: 2, 5), glockenspiel (track: 4), organ (track: 6)
 Derek Watkins – trumpet (tracks: 3, 6, 10)
 Andy Parker – viola (tracks: 6, 7, 9)
 Bruce White – viola (tracks: 1, 2, 4, 6 to 9)
 Peter Lale – viola (tracks: 1 to 9, 11)
 Vicci Wardman – viola (tracks: 1, 2, 4, 6, to 9)
 Boguslaw Kostecki – violin (tracks: 1, 2, 4, 6 to 9)
 Gordon Buchan – violin (tracks: 6, 7, 9)
 John Bradbury – violin (tracks: 6, 7, 9)
 Julian Leaper – violin (tracks: 1, 2, 4, 6 to 9)
 Maciej Rakowski – violin (tracks: 6, 7, 9)
 Patrick Kiernan – violin (tracks: 6, 7, 9)
 Paul Willey – violin (tracks: 6, 7, 9)
 Rita Manning – violin (tracks: 1, 2, 4, 6 to 9)
 Roger Garland – violin (tracks: 1, 2, 4 to 9, 11)
 Rolf Wilson – violin (tracks: 1 to 8)
 Simon Baggs – violin (tracks: 6, 7, 9)
 Rolf Wilson – violin (leader) (tracks: 1, 2, 4, 6 to 9)
 Derek Watkins – flugelhorn (tracks: 2, 6) 
 Alasdair Malloy – harmonica (glass), percussion (track: 8)  
 Victoria Walpole – Cor Anglais (track: 4)
 Alasdair Mallory – marimba (track: 4) 
 Steve Pearce – bass (track: 6)
 Jamie Talbot – saxophone (tracks: 6, 10) 
 Julian Jackson – harmonica (track: 10)

Production
 Anne Dudley – producer, arranger
 Mat Bartram – sound engineer
 Steve Price – sound engineer
 Roger Dudley – sound engineer, sound mixing

Charts

References

2004 albums
Alison Moyet albums
Covers albums
Sanctuary Records albums